Wojciech Wąsikiewicz (born 15 July 1946 – 4 March 2015) was a Polish football manager. who previously played for Olimpia Poznań as a player.

References

1946 births
2015 deaths
Polish football managers
Dyskobolia Grodzisk Wielkopolski managers
Warta Poznań managers
Amica Wronki managers
Lech Poznań managers
Arka Gdynia managers
Footballers from Poznań